Sand Hill is a summit located in Central New York Region of New York located in the Town of Russia in Herkimer County, east-northeast of Poland.

References

Mountains of Herkimer County, New York
Mountains of New York (state)